Layer is a 2022 Russian crime drama film directed by Stanislav Sapachyov. It stars Vladimir Vdovichenkov and Kirill Käro. 
The tape is available for viewing exclusively in the KION online cinema from April 1, 2022.
It was theatrically released on April 14, 2022, by Planeta Inform Film Distribution.

Plot 
Yevgeny Sergeyevich sets a difficult task for Slava and Zhenya: they need to sell a contraband sun stone, as a result of which Zhenya has an idea how to quickly become what he dreamed of being since childhood. But what is he capable of this and will he be able to maintain friendship with Slava?

Cast 
 Vladimir Vdovichenkov as Slava
 Kirill Käro as Zhenya
 Viktoriya Bogatyryova as Olga
 Sergey Makovetsky as Yevgeny Sergeyevich
 Emila Yegorova as Dasha
 Yevgeniya Tereshchenko as Katya
 Ameliya Kulikova as Anya

Production
Filming took place in the city of Kaliningrad and nearby resort towns of Svetlogorsk, Zelenogradsk and Yantarny, Kaliningrad Oblast, Russia.

References

External links 
 

2022 films
2020s Russian-language films
2022 crime drama films
Russian crime drama films